Geoffrey Warren (born February 1955) is the owner of Cargiant, the world's largest independent car dealership.

Career 
In 1976, Warren founded Cargiant. In 2007, Cargiant became the world's largest independent car dealership. As of 2018, Cargiant stocked around 8,000 cars on a 45-acre site.

In December 2019, the Old Oak and Park Royal Development Corporation (OPDC) had planned to buy 54 acres at Old Oak Common owned by Cargiant by compulsory purchase order, but Cargiant successfully disputed the value of the land, and the sale fell through.

As of 2021, Warren owns 6.33 million sq ft of land in London. Based on a 2017 list compiled by propertyweek.com, Warren is estimated to be London’s 10th largest land owner.

Warren has a net worth of £2.552 billion, according to The Sunday Times Rich List 2022.

Personal life 
In 2016, Warren was linked to the purchase of the UK's most expensive property in One Hyde Park.

References 

1955 births
Living people
British retail company founders
Businesspeople from London